Bhorer Allo is a Bengali language romantic comedy suspense film released in India on 22 April 2011. The film is written and directed by Prabhat Roy. It revolves around four central characters, played by popular actors Rituparna Sengupta and Priyanshu Chatterjee, TV serial actor and anchor Rohit Roy, and debutante actress Anusmriti Sarkar.

Synopsis

The story revolves around four protagonists: Arunabha Mitra, a wealthy middle-aged man, his daughter Rinka, two sisters — Sreemati and Payel, and the playboy Subhankar Bose. The film is about crisis in identity, love, betrayal and the strange twists of fate. It is also about how we fail to trust the people we love and how quick we are to jump to conclusions. The conflict in the story arises when one of the protagonists impulsively acts on intense concern for her sister and commits a crime that would forever change the course of everybody’s life.

Cast
 Priyanshu Chatterjee as Arunabha Mitra: A middle class turned dignified rich man. He is a real estate developer. He has a daughter Rinka and wife who has expired during rinka's birth.
 Rituparna Sengupta as Srimati Chatterjee: A Classical dancer who manages her family which consist of an old father and a loving little sister.
 Rohit Roy as Subhankar Bose: A music lover, singer and a playboy.
 Anusmriti Sarkar as Rinka and Payel. Rinka is extrovert, arrogant, and obstinate child while Payel is beautiful, loving and faithful girl.
 Debosmita as Tanima: Best friend of Payel.
 Rajesh as Gitz: Best friend of Rinka.

Soundtrack

The music album released on 31 March 2011 by Green Pigeon Music.

References

External links
 Music Launch
 Music Release
 First Look of the movie

2011 romantic comedy films
Films scored by Jeet Ganguly
2011 films
Indian romantic comedy films
Bengali-language Indian films
2010s Bengali-language films
Films directed by Prabhat Roy